George Buchan (born 2 May 1950) is a Scottish former footballer. Born in Aberdeen, his regular position was as a forward. He played professionally for Aberdeen, Manchester United and Bury. While at Manchester United, he played briefly alongside his brother, Martin. Buchan later played non-League football in North West England, listing Mossley, Ashton United and Glossop among his clubs.

Career statistics

References

External links
Profile at MUFCInfo.com

1950 births
Living people
Footballers from Aberdeen
Scottish footballers
Manchester United F.C. players
Bury F.C. players
Aberdeen F.C. players
Banks O' Dee F.C. players
Scottish Football League players
English Football League players
Ashton United F.C. players
Association football wingers
Mossley A.F.C. players
Glossop North End A.F.C. players
Scottish Junior Football Association players